Savannah (also, Savanna) is a former settlement in Los Angeles County, California. The rail depot of that name was located on the line of the Southern Pacific Railroad between San Gabriel and El Monte, at an elevation of 276 feet (84 m).

Savannah was promoted with considerable dignity in 1887-88 but vanished, nevertheless; the neighborhood of the depot has been absorbed by Rosemead.  The name survives in Savanna High School and Savanna School District of Orange County, which seceded from Los Angeles County in 1889.

Savannah was the location of Camp Monte, a Rebel base where State militias trained openly for participation in the Civil War until Federal troops suppressed it by establishing Camp Carleton in 1862.  Camp Monte is recalled today in "Johnny Rebel," the mascot of Savanna High School and name for a statue of a Civil-War era soldier in the quad.

References

Former settlements in Los Angeles County, California
Former populated places in California